= Contemporary Directions in Asian American Dance =

2018 essay collection

Contemporary Directions in Asian American Dance is a collection of essays edited by Yutian Wong, and published in 2018 by University of Wisconsin Press.

== Background ==
Wong previously wrote Choreographing Asian America, released in 2010.

== Content ==
Wong wrote the introduction, and there are seven other chapters.

== Reviews ==
Emily Wilcox of the University of Michigan praised the book for the detail and having a consistent "quality".

Natalia Duong of the University of California, Berkeley stated that the work is appropriate for introductory and topic specialist readers, citing an "approachable tone" for the former and "nuanced complexity" for the latter.
